Mortsel is a railway station in Mortsel, just south of the city of Antwerp, Antwerp, Belgium. The station opened in 1895 on the Line 27. The station Mortsel-Deurnesteenweg is located just 100 m east of this station on the line towards Brussels. It serves Antwerp International Airport.

The former station house is now used as a community centre.

Train services 
The station is served by the following services:

Local services (L-23) Antwerp – Aarschot – Leuven
Local services (L-24) Antwerp – Herentals – Mol (weekdays)
Brussels RER services (S1) Antwerp – Mechelen – Brussels – Waterloo – Nivelles (weekdays)

fservices

Bus services 
Bus services 33, 51, 52 and 53 serve the station, these are operated by De Lijn.

External links 
Belgian Railways website
De Lijn website

Railway stations opened in 1895
Railway stations in Belgium
Railway stations in Antwerp Province
Mortsel